WAYR-FM (90.7 MHz) is a non-profit radio station licensed to Brunswick, Georgia, USA, and serving the Georgia coast and northern suburbs of Jacksonville, Florida. The station broadcasts a Christian adult contemporary radio format, and is owned by Good Tidings Trust, Inc. WAYR-FM holds periodic fundraisers on the air and asks for listener support.

The studios and offices are on Russell Road in Green Cove Springs, Florida, along with the co-owned AM 550 WAYR, which broadcasts a Christian talk and teaching format. WAYR-FM's transmitter is off Rose Drive in Brunswick.

History
In 1996, the station first signed on as WAGQ. It broadcast a Christian adult contemporary format and was owned by Hi I-Q Radio, Inc. It was powered at 1,500 watts, with its signal limited to communities around Brunswick. WAGQ was bought by Way Radio, Inc. in November 1998 for $100,000. The call sign was changed to WAYR-FM. Way Radio increased the station's power to 2,300 watts a short time later. In the early 2010s, it increased its power to 14,000 watts, extending its coverage to the northern suburbs of Jacksonville.

References

External links
WAYR's official website

AYR-FM
Radio stations established in 1998
AYR-FM